Revolutionary Communist Party – Red Trench (in Spanish: Partido Comunista Revolucionario - Trinchera Roja) was a communist party in Peru. PCR-TR was formed in 1977, through a split in the PCR. PCR-TR was led by Agustín Haya de la Torre and Jorge Nieto.

PCR-TR joined the UDP.

In 1984 it became one of the founding organizations of Mariateguist Unified Party (PUM).

See also
 Communist Party of India (Marxist-Leninist) Red Flag
 Communist Party - Red Star, in Peru
 Communist Party of Peru - Red Fatherland
 Peruvian Communist Party (Red Flag)

References

Political parties established in 1977
Communist parties in Peru